Oleksandr Ivanovych Sorokalet (born 16 April 1957 in Luhansk; died 6 November 2009 in Rostov-on-Don) was a Soviet Ukrainian professional football player.

Honours
 Soviet Top League champion: 1980, 1981, 1988.
 Soviet Top League runner-up: 1982, 1987, 1989.
 Soviet Top League bronze: 1985.
 Soviet Cup winner: 1982, 1989.
 USSR Super Cup winner: 1989.
 USSR Federation Cup winner: 1986, 1989.

European club competitions
 1981–82 European Cup with FC Dynamo Kyiv: 1 game.
 1982–83 European Cup with FC Dynamo Kyiv: 4 games.
 1986–87 UEFA Cup with FC Dnipro Dnipropetrovsk: 2 games.
 1988–89 UEFA Cup with FC Dnipro Dnipropetrovsk: 2 games.

External links
 Career summary by KLISF

References

1957 births
2009 deaths
Footballers from Luhansk
Russian footballers
Soviet footballers
Ukrainian footballers
Soviet Top League players
Ukrainian Premier League players
FC Zorya Luhansk players
FC Dynamo Kyiv players
FC Dnipro players
FC Metalurh Zaporizhzhia players
MFC Mykolaiv players
Association football defenders